In mathematics, a constructible sheaf is a sheaf of abelian groups over some topological space X, such that X is the union of a finite number of locally closed subsets on each of which the sheaf is a locally constant sheaf. It has its origins in algebraic geometry, where in étale cohomology constructible sheaves are defined in a similar way . For the derived category of constructible sheaves, see a section in ℓ-adic sheaf.

The finiteness theorem in étale cohomology states that the higher direct images of a constructible sheaf are constructible.

Definition of étale constructible sheaves on a scheme X
Here we use the definition of constructible étale sheaves from the book by Freitag and Kiehl referenced below. In what follows in this subsection, all sheaves  on schemes  are étale sheaves unless otherwise noted.

A sheaf  is called constructible if  can be written as a finite union of locally closed subschemes  such that for each subscheme  of the covering, the sheaf  is a finite locally constant sheaf.

It then follows that a representable étale sheaf  is itself constructible.

Of particular interest to the theory of constructible étale sheaves is the case in which one works with constructible étale sheaves of Abelian groups. The remarkable result is that constructible étale sheaves of Abelian groups are precisely the Noetherian objects in the category of all torsion étale sheaves (cf. Proposition I.4.8 of Freitag-Kiehl).

Examples in algebraic topology 
Most examples of constructible sheaves come from intersection cohomology sheaves or from the derived pushforward of a local system on a family of topological spaces parameterized by a base space.

Derived Pushforward on P1
For example, we can set the monodromy operators to be

Weierstrass Family of Elliptic Curves
For example, consider the family of degenerating elliptic curves

At  this family of curves degenerates into a nodal curve. If we denote this family by  then

and

This local monodromy around of this local system around  can be computed using the Picard–Lefschetz formula

References

Seminar Notes

References

Algebraic geometry
Sheaf theory